Averbis has a focus on healthcare, pharma, automotive and intellectual property analytics. Averbis is involved in various research projects of the German Federal Ministry of Economics and Energy and the European Union such as DebugIT, EUCases, Mantra  and SEMCARE.

In addition to these projects, Averbis was also involved in the following projects:

Greenpilot is a virtual library, which provides technical information in the fields of nutrition, environment and agriculture.
 is a virtual library, which provides information about medicine and related sciences.

In 2013, Averbis has been nominated for the German Founder Prize 2013.

Averbis GmbH provides text analytics and text mining software to transform unstructured text into actionable information. It was founded in 2007 by IT experts after years of relevant scientific experience in the field of text mining and multilingual information retrieval. Averbis works in the field of terminology management, natural language processing, machine learning and semantic search. Its text mining software is embedded into the text mining framework UIMA.

See also

 Enterprise Search
 Information retrieval
 Linguistics
 Knowledge Management
 Natural Language Processing
 Semantics

References

External links 
 
 Technology Competition Federal Ministry of Economy and Energy
 BMWi Research Project Trusted Cloud
 BMWi Research Project cloud4health

Natural language processing